The 1998 Mount Union Purple Raiders football team was an American football team that represented the University of Mount Union in the Ohio Athletic Conference (OAC) during the 1998 NCAA Division III football season. In their 13th year under head coach Larry Kehres, the Purple Raiders compiled a perfect 14–0 record, won the OAC championship, and outscored opponents by a total of 523 to 227.  They qualified for the NCAA Division III playoffs and advanced to the national championship team, defeating , 44–24.

Mount Union's 1997 season was part of a record 54-game winning streak that spanned four seasons, commencing on September 14, 1996 and continuing through December 6, 1998. The national championship was the third in three years and the fourth in six years.

Quarterback Gary Smeck and receiver Adam Marino led the team on offense.

The team played its home games at Mount Union Stadium in Alliance, Ohio.

Schedule

References

Mount Union
Mount Union Purple Raiders football seasons
NCAA Division III Football Champions
College football undefeated seasons
Mount Union Purple Raiders football